Bor is a town in Nizhny Novgorod Oblast, Russia, located on the left (northern) bank of the Volga River, across from Nizhny Novgorod. The two cities are connected by bridges built in 1965 and 2017, and by ferry service. Population:     51,000 (1969).

History
Bor was founded in the 14th century and was granted town status in 1938.  In June 2021, an American studying in Nizhny Novgorod was abducted and murdered in Bor.

In early 2008, the Nizhny Novgorod Oblast authorities were discussing the plans for constructing a futuristic "Globe Town" on the low Volga shore opposite Nizhny Novgorod, within Bor's town limits. In March 2008, the Italian architectural firm of Dante O. Benini was chosen as the main designer for the project.

Administrative and municipal status
Within the framework of administrative divisions, it is, together with 300 rural localities, incorporated as the town of oblast significance of Bor—an administrative unit with the status equal to that of the districts. As a municipal division, the town of oblast significance of Bor is incorporated as Bor Urban Okrug.

Economy

Local industries include shipbuilding (Nizhegorodskiy Teplokhod) and glass-making. The local glass plant, Bor Glass Works, has been manufacturing glass for the GAZ cars and trucks, as well as glassware for table use, since 1934.

Notable people
Vyacheslav Zudov, cosmonaut
Eduard Rossel, politician and former governor of Sverdlovsk Oblast

References

Notes

Sources

External links
Official website of Bor 
Bor Business Directory 

Cities and towns in Nizhny Novgorod Oblast
Populated places on the Volga
Bor Urban Okrug
Semyonovsky Uyezd